Ek Love Ya is Indian Kannada-language romantic action film written and directed by Prem and produced by Rakshita under, Rakshita Film Factory. The film features Rakshita's brother Raanna as the lead, Reeshma in their debut. It also features Rachita Ram. Arjun Janya was hired to compose the music, while the cinematography and editing was handled by Mahendra Simha and Srinivas P Babu, respectively.

Plot 
Amar is a young man, who wants to fulfils his father Shankar's dream of becoming a lawyer. Years later, Amar becomes an alcoholic lawyer working for famous criminal lawyer named CH Vishwanath and meets Swati, a junior lawyer and Vishwanath's daughter. 

A flashback reveals that Amar had loved his childhood girlfriend Anitha, but she leaves him without any reason, thus Amar wants to kill Anitha. However, It is revealed that Anitha actually loved Amar, but sacrificed her love due to Shankar's request as Shankar doesn't want Amar's career-ambition to be spoiled due to Amar's love for Anitha. When Anitha is mysteriously thrown from a under-construction building and is in coma. The officials pinpoint on Amar, who is arrested by the police and is awaiting punishment from the court. Shankar reveals about Anitha's sacrifice which leaves Amar heartbroken and realize his mistake about misjudging Anitha.

The next day at the court, Amar escapes from the cops and seeks his friends and Swathi's help to sneak Anitha out of the hospital. They embark on an investigation and check the CCTV footage with Swati's help where they find Amar's friend Daisy, who is a sex worker and enquires her only to learn that the culprit was at the hotel, They check the Hotel manager who arrives at the resident named Ramesh's house, who booked the hotel's room but finds Ramesh, along with Daisy dead. They also enquire Anitha and Amar's common friend Sheela where they learn that Anitha wanted to meet Amar for reconciliation, but was too late as the culprit had sent her to coma by pushing her from construction site. 

They enquire a wedding videographer who was at the hotel and finds that Anitha was waiting for her. Sheela calls Amar to reveal that the culprit has arrived. Amar arrives at Sheela's house and produces the culprit to the court where the culprit reveals himself as Lakshman and accepts his misdeeds where Amar is exonerated from the charges and is proven innocent. While leaving for the prison, Lakshman is shot dead by Anitha's father. Amar calls Vishwanath to have a chit-chat where Amar reveals that the culprit was actually a scapegoat and reveals that Vishwanath's son Arjun is the main culprit. Vishwanath had learnt about Arjun's misdeeds and is determined to protect him and blamed Amar for the murder and ask the culprit to finish off the eyewitnesses, who knows about his son including Anitha. 

When Vishwanath ask about Arjun, Amar tells him that he killed Arjun and thrown his body in a dumping yard, thus avenging Anitha's injustice. Swathi, learning of Vishwanath and Arjun's misdeeds is disgusted and begins to loathe them. The film ends with Amar living with his friends in their hill house and is seen talking to Anitha (though she is mentally unstable).

Cast
 Abhishek Rao (Stage Name Raanna) as Amar 
 Reeshma Nanaiah as Anitha, Amar's love interest
 Rachita Ram as Swathi, Vishwanath's daughter
 Ankita Naik as Daisy, a sex worker
 Shashi Kumar as Shankar, Amar's Father
 Charan Raj as Lawyer CH Vishwanath
 Cockroach Sudhi as Couple Raghu
 Sooraj as Amar's friend 
 Nidhi as Sheela, Anitha and Amar's friend
 Rakshita - Special appearance in the Song "Yennegu Hennigu"	
 Prem - Special appearance in the Song "Yennegu Hennigu"
 Arjun Gowda as Arjun, Vishwanath's son and Swathi's brother

Release
Although initially anticipating to release in early to mid 2020, Prem has delayed the release due to health issues of Janya and the COVID-19 pandemic in India. It was rescheduled for 21 January 2022, but was postponed again to 24 February 2022.

Soundtrack

The soundtrack is composed by Arjun Janya, and is being released in Kannada, Telugu, Tamil, and Malayalam.

Reception 

Sunayana Suresh of The Times of India rated the film 3.5 out of 5 stars and wrote "The film is definitely worth a watch for those who love commercial cinema. It could have been edgier had it been shorter and more tightly woven. This would have ensured the intensity would have been more effective".

A. Sharadha of The New Indian Expressrated the film 3.5 out of 5 and termed it as "A deeply romantic drama with a twist of hate" OTTPlay wrote "Ek Love Ya review: A start-to-finish showcase for debutant Raanna, who shows promise, albeit in run-of-the-mill film" and gave a rating of 3 out of 5.

References

External links 
 

2022 films
2022 action films
Indian action films
2020s Kannada-language films
Films directed by Prem